The Minnesota State Mavericks women's ice hockey team represents Minnesota State University, Mankato in the 2011–12 NCAA Division I women's ice hockey season and attempt to qualify for the NCAA Frozen Four.

Offseason

Recruiting

Transfers

Regular season

News and notes
September 30: The Minnesota State Mavericks nearly gave the Lindenwood Lady Lions its first NCAA Division I win versus the Minnesota State Mavericks. The Lady Lions fought back from a two goal deficit with two third-period goals. A late goal by Kathleen Rogan gave Minnesota State a 4-3 lead, which they would not relinquish. At 5:24 in the second period. Less than a minute later, Kendra Broad scored the first goal in Lindenwood's NCAA history unassisted. Minnesota State outshot the Lady Lions 53-16, as Lady Lions goaltender Taylor Fairchild made 49 saves.
October 7: Minnesota State senior Emmi Leinonen scored the first two goals in the game versus Mercyhurst. In overtime, Nicole Germaine scored her first goal of the year as the Mavericks upset the nationally ranked Mercyhurst Lakers by a 3-2 tally.
October 8: Minnesota State was unable to extend its three-game winning streak as #8 nationally ranked Mercyhurst (2-2-0) scored in the third period to win by a 5-4 score. Lakers forward Christine Bestland scored the game-winning goal as Mavericks goaltender Danielle Butters suffered her first loss of the season.

Standings

Schedule

Awards and honors
Alli Altmann, Minnesota State, WCHA Defensive Player of the Week (Week of December 14, 2011)
Kathleen Rogan, WCHA Player of the Week (Week of October 5, 2011)

References

Mankato Mavericks
Minnesota State Mavericks women's ice hockey seasons